The Heat And Warmth Fund (THAW) is an independent 501(c)(3) non-profit agency that provides low-income individuals and families throughout Michigan with emergency energy assistance and advocates for long-term solutions to energy issues. It is Michigan's statewide utility assistance provider of last resort.

Since its founding in 1985, THAW has provided more than $145 million in assistance to more than 200,000 Michigan households.

References

External links
 The Heat and Warmth Fund — official website
 DTE Energy "Cents for Energy" campaign supporting THAW
 WWJ-AM "Winter Survival Radiothon" supporting THAW
 Charity Navigator listing for THAW

Organizations established in 1985
Residential heating
Organizations based in Detroit
1985 establishments in Michigan
Charities based in Michigan
Energy economics